The Rose of Roscrae is a studio album by American musician Tom Russell. It was released in April 2015 under Proper Records. The misspelling of Roscrea is apparently intentional.

Track listing

References

2015 albums
Proper Records albums